Philip A Drew (born 1948), is a male former diver who competed for England.

Diving career
He represented England and won a silver medal in the 10 metres platform, at the 1970 British Commonwealth Games in Edinburgh, Scotland.

He was a member of the Highgate Diving Club and also competed in the springboard in which he was a Middlesex and Southern counties champion.

References

1948 births
English male divers
Commonwealth Games medallists in diving
Commonwealth Games silver medallists for England
Divers at the 1970 British Commonwealth Games
Living people
Medallists at the 1970 British Commonwealth Games